The Dungeons & Dragons Computer Labyrinth Game was an electronic board game released by Mattel in 1980.

Description
The board appears as a plastic castle with a chess board sized grid in the middle. Underneath the superstructure is a drawer, in which can be found two metal warrior figures, a dragon, a treasure chest, plus a number of plastic pieces to be used as walls, and a couple of secret room markers. The castle is also a computer of sorts, and the gridded playing surface is a touch sensitive key board. Each time the game is turned on the computer randomly creates an invisible labyrinth wherein lies the imaginary treasure, and the dragon.

Gameplay
This was a simple electronic board game, with a dungeon and a dragon in it. The computer places 50 walls randomly across the board, and then two players can compete head to head. Each player tries to and hinder the other's advances, while searching each room for the treasure. If a player encounters the dragon, the player is injured and returns to his or her secret room.

The game can be played solitaire or with two players, each assuming the role of a warrior. The aim is for the player to find the treasure and get it back to the player's secret room. The game begins by selecting the basic level or advanced level (which includes doors, that may or may not be open the second time a warrior tries to go through them). Then the player selects a secret room. Each time the warrior enters a square (the warrior can move 8 squares a turn until the warrior walks into a door or wall or gets wounded) the castle emits various noises, which have different meanings. It could be a clear space or the warrior might bump into an invisible wall. There are electronic sounds to tell the players that the dragon (initially asleep) has woken (which happens three squares from the treasure), that the player has found the treasure, that the dragon is flying towards the warrior and that the invisible dragon is attacking. The warrior can sustain three such attacks before dying, and each attack also reduces the warrior's movement allowance in squares, which means the dragon can move that much more often, as he moves after the warrior's move is finished.  As the dragon moves only 1 square a time, the player will need to find where he is, lure him to the other side of the board, and then rush back, grab the treasure and get back to the player's secret room.  In the two player game warriors can attack each other, each warrior having a variable computer moderated strength.

A player moves his figurine from square to square; depending on what is in the square, an electronic sound would be triggered, allowing a player to figure out where walls were located. Another sound would indicate that the dragon's treasure hoard had been located, and between player turns, the "Dragon" sound would indicate that the dragon had moved one square. When the dragon first wakes, it is not possible to know exactly where the dragon is on the board (although one can make a reasonable guess by choosing a square three spaces away in a direction that has not been previously approached). Once the dragon attacks a player, the dragon's position is known for the remainder of the game and can be marked with the included dragon figurine. The algorithm for the dragon's movement is well explained: it moves one space per turn towards a target, going diagonal and over walls if necessary. The dragon's target is the player who has the treasure, or, if no player has the treasure, the closest player. If two players are equally close, the dragon follows the player it was following in the previous move. If both players are hidden in their secret rooms, the dragon moves toward the treasure room.

Reception
Jamie Thompson reviewed the game for White Dwarf, giving the game an overall rating of 4, stating "The low rating is an assessment of the game for all age groups, but it is more suitable for the very young." Thompson was critical of the game, and quipped "Not, as you can see, the TSR version but merely a small electronic game of the same name. I wonder how much Mattel paid TSR for using the name."  Thompson described the board as "a cheap looking plastic castle" that came with "two cheap metal warrior figures [and] a tinny-looking dragon". Thompson commented that when moving into a space that is not clear, "you might find that your heroic warrior is blundering into yet another invisible wall". Thompson found that players attacking each other in a two player game "providing a bit more interest to the quest" and determined that a single solitaire game will last about 10–15 minutes at most, two player games a little longer.  Thompson concluded the review by saying, "All in all it provides some initial light fun - hearing the dragon wake, take to the air and then suddenly find he's upon you and the like - but it soon loses its flavour. I would say not a good buy for the serious or experienced adult gamer, especially when you consider the ridiculous price. I'd never go into a shop and actually buy this (unless I had spare cash to throw around and a kid to buy it for). The game appears to make no reference to any suitable age groups, but, I suspect it is really quite a good game for the under 12s (at least), being simplicity itself to learn. The code sounds soon become familiar and rules are clear and well laid out. Its major drawback is its price."

Reviews
 1981 Games 100 in Games
1982 Games 100 in Games
Electronic Games
Jeux & Stratégie #12

See also
Dungeons & Dragons Computer Fantasy Game, Mattel's next Dungeons & Dragons game

References

External links
Boardgamegeek.com

Board games introduced in 1980
Dungeons & Dragons board games
Electronic board games
Mattel games